Cadmon may refer to:
 Cædmon 
 Adam Kadmon